Henry Otway Trevor, 21st Baron Dacre, CB (27 July 1777 – 2 June 1853) was a British peer and soldier.

Early life
Born Henry Otway Brand, he was the second son of Thomas Brand and his wife the 19th Baroness Dacre.

Career
In 1807, he fought at Copenhagen and commanded the 1st Battalion of the Coldstream Guards during the Peninsular War, seeing action at Salamanca, Talavera and Buçaco. In 1815, he was appointed a Companion of the Order of the Bath and on inheriting the estates of his cousin, John Trevor-Hampden, 3rd Viscount Hampden, changed his surname to Trevor. In 1851, he inherited his childless brother's title and also became a General that year.

Personal life

On 24 August 1806, he married Pyne Crosbie (a sister of William Crosbie, 4th Baron Brandon and ex-wife of Sir John Gordon, 6th Baronet) and they had six children:

 Hon. Thomas Crosbie William, later 22nd Baron Dacre (1808–1890)
 Hon. Henry Bouverie William, later 23rd Baron Dacre and 1st Viscount Hampden (1814–1892)
 Hon. Pyne Jesse (d. 1872), married Sir John Henry Cotterell, had one son Sir Geers Cotterell, 3rd Baronet. After his death, she married Granville Harcourt-Vernon.
 Hon. Julia (d. 1858), married Samuel Charles Whitbread.
 Hon. Gertrude (d. 1883), married Sir George Seymour.
 Hon. Frederica Mary Jane (1812–1873).

Upon the death of Lord Dacre in 1853, his title passed to his eldest son, Thomas.

Sources
Burke's Peerage & Gentry

References

Companions of the Order of the Bath
British Army generals
1777 births
1853 deaths
British Army personnel of the Napoleonic Wars
Coldstream Guards officers
21